Amausi railway station is a local railway station in Lucknow, Uttar Pradesh. Its code is AMS. It serves lucknow city as well as the suburbs of lucknow. The station consists of three platforms.

It is located at 7 km from the Lucknow International Airport and use full for those passengers who are coming from any other city to lucknow international airport.

Amausi is one of the local stations in Lucknow and lies on Lucknow–Kanpur Suburban Railway.

Major trains 

Some of the important trains that run from Amausi are:

 Chitrakoot Express
 Lucknow–Jhansi Passenger
 Lucknow Junction–Kasganj Passenger
 Kasganj–Lucknow Junction Passenger
 Kanpur–Lucknow MEMU
 Lucknow–Kanpur MEMU
 Kanpur Central–Barabanki MEMU
 Panki–Kanpur–Lucknow Junction MEMU

References

Railway stations in Lucknow
Lucknow NR railway division